Beat Until Stiff is the second release, and first full-length album, by Hullabaloo. It was released in 1989 on Toxic Shock. For Beat Until Stiff, TQ had taken over as full-time lead singer for the band (though Sluggo sings on the tune "Taskmaster" and hidden track "Sea of Trash"), and his vocals that range from a growl to a scream begin to characterize the band's sound. The band's punk rock sensibilities are still in the forefront with fast, thrashy songs like "The Lickyerbutt Song" and "This is My Rifle", and with subjects like "Retardo Porn" and "Suicidal Maniac." But with the songs "Beat Until Stiff" and "Gotta Go" some slower tempos and heavier guitars are introduced, giving the album a proto-grunge feel. The trademark trumpet and saxophone solos are still present throughout. Kris Fell, in the Boston Phoenix said that the "lyrics on Beat Until Stiff are blunt, almost photographic representation of the grotesque..."  This album features a guitar solo by Mr. Horribly Charred Infant of the Happy Flowers.

Note that Hullabaloo rarely used their real names and instruments on the personnel listing of their records. The names on this record are their "British Invasion" names. These names are also scrawled upon a picture of the British invasion band The Hullaballoos on the inner sleeve.

Beat Until Stiff'''s new songs were recorded and mixed at the Fort Apache South studio by Paul Q. Kolderie. Kolderie also re-mixed the two previously released songs for this album. The cover art for the album lists the producers as "Hugo & Luigi," but this is yet another allusion to The Hullaballoos, who were "packaged for U.S. consumption by Hugo Peretti and Luigi Creatore, notorious vice presidents and A&R directors of Roulette Records.".

Critical receptionBeat Until Stiff rolls like a big old tank truck fulla beer and piss taking a fast turn onto Alice Cooper Memorial Turnpike.—SpinHere's a totally psychotic mindfuck if there ever was one....Satan himself would shit his pants if he heard the vocals on this album.—GROTAn album worth having two copies of, for when your first wears out.—BacklashTQ hollers as if possessed by the spirits of both Ozzy and Jimmy Swaggart while the band bashes out chords of destruction and disarray...—CMJIf Marlon Brando's Godfather figure had been played by a growling lion, he would be the singer of this band.''—Rockpool

Track listing

Personnel
Hullabaloo
Spanker Phelge 
Ronny Sores 
Harry "Squirty" Sores 
Horseglue Minibike 
Technical personnel
Paul Kolderie - Recording of all songs except †; Mixing of all songs
Jeff Landrock - Recording of †
J.J. Gonson - Photography

References

External links

1989 albums
Hullabaloo (band) albums
Toxic Shock Records albums
Albums produced by Paul Q. Kolderie